Kelapa Sawit is a small town located along Jalan Kulai-Air Hitam Malaysian Federal Roads System route 1 in Kulai District, Johor, Malaysia. Kelapa Sawit means oil palm in Bahasa Malaysia. A mainly Hakka community which was formed back in the 1950s when the British; who were the colonial masters of Malaya moved tens of thousands of the ethnic Chinese people into New Towns like this during the Malayan Emergency. Many of the older generations still keep up with tradition and communicate using the Hakka dialect. 

Located next to the Sime Darby palm oil plantation, this was the origin of the town's name. It faced some problems of air pollution until the estate's oil palm mill was closed down. Villagers were mainly reliant on agriculture for a living. Before tax on pepper kicked in in the 1980s, Kelapa Sawit was the famous Pepper producing town. Farmers has since relied on other crops such as Palm Oil, Durian and other leafy vegetables mainly targeted at the Singapore market. In recent years this town has transformed itself from a sleepy town into a tourist destination with murals, creative art works and traditional hakka food as their selling point. Many tourists mainly from nearby Singapore visit Kelapa Sawit as a quick weekend getaway.

Schools
Schools in Kelapa Sawit town include Sekolah Jenis Kebangsaan (C) Sawit, Sekolah Agama Batu 26, and SK Polis Kem. SJK(C) Sawit was formed when 8 schools from nearby towns were relocated and merged during the emergency period.

Transportation
The only public bus service which serves Kelapa Sawit is the City Bus (Formerly known as South Johore Omnibus) service number 2 from Larkin Sentral to the town of Air Hitam.

Kulai District